Thierry Tchuenté (born 27 March 1992) is a Cameroonian footballer who plays as a midfielder. In January 2020, Tchuente signed a two-and-a-half-year contract with CS Chebba.

References

External links
 
 

1992 births
Living people
Association football midfielders
Cameroonian footballers
Cameroon youth international footballers
Cameroon international footballers
CS Chebba players
Al-Dahab Club players
Coton Sport FC de Garoua players
Elite One players
Tunisian Ligue Professionnelle 1 players
Saudi Second Division players
Cameroonian expatriate footballers
Expatriate footballers in Tunisia
Expatriate footballers in Saudi Arabia
Cameroonian expatriate sportspeople in Tunisia
Cameroonian expatriate sportspeople in Saudi Arabia
Cameroon A' international footballers
2020 African Nations Championship players